Winnipeg Monarchs is a name used by several Canadian ice hockey teams in Winnipeg, Manitoba and may refer to:

Winnipeg Monarchs (senior), a defunct ice hockey team, 1935 World Ice Hockey Champions
Winnipeg Monarchs (MJHL), a defunct junior ice hockey team, 3-time Memorial Cup champions
Winnipeg Monarchs (WHL), a defunct major junior ice hockey team